Mohsin Shahnawaz Ranjha (born 22 July 1977) is a Pakistani politician who has been a member of the National Assembly of Pakistan since August 2018. Previously, he was a member of the National Assembly from June 2013 to May 2018. He served as Minister of State for Parliamentary Affairs, in Abbasi cabinet from October 2017 to May 2018.

Early life

He was born on 22 July 1977.

Political career
He ran for the seat of the National Assembly of Pakistan as a candidate of Pakistan Muslim League (N) (PML-N) from Constituency NA-65 (Sargodha-II) in 2008 Pakistani general election but was unsuccessful. He received 41,655 votes and lost the seat to Ghias Mela. In the same election, he also ran for the seat of Provincial Assembly of the Punjab from Constituency PP-32 (Sargodha-V) as an independent candidate but was unsuccessful. He received 1,036 votes and lost the seat to Chaudhry Aamir Sultan Cheema.

He was elected to the National Assembly as a candidate of PML-N from Constituency NA-65 (Sargodha-II) in 2013 Pakistani general election. He received 102,871 votes and defeated Ghias Mela. During his tenure as Member of the National Assembly, he served as the Federal Parliamentary Secretary for Information and Broadcasting.

Following the election of Shahid Khaqan Abbasi as Prime Minister of Pakistan in August 2017, he was inducted into the federal cabinet of Abbasi and was made Minister of State, however he was not assigned any ministry. In October 2017, he was made Minister of State for Parliamentary Affairs. Upon the dissolution of the National Assembly on the expiration of its term on 31 May 2018, Ranjha ceased to hold the office as Minister of State for Parliamentary Affairs.

He was re-elected to the National Assembly as a candidate of PML-N from Constituency NA-89 (Sargodha-II) in 2018 Pakistani general election.

References

Living people
Pakistan Muslim League (N) politicians
Punjabi people
Pakistani MNAs 2013–2018
1977 births
Pakistani MNAs 2018–2023